The 2012 Kirklees Metropolitan Borough Council election took place on 3 May 2012 to elect members of Kirklees Metropolitan Borough Council in West Yorkshire, England. This was on the same day as other 2012 United Kingdom local elections.

Ward results
Spoilt votes not included below.

Almondbury ward

Ashbrow ward

Batley East ward

Batley West ward

Birstall & Birkenshaw ward

Cleckheaton ward

Colne Valley ward

Crosland Moor & Netherton ward

Dalton ward

Denby Dale ward

Dewsbury East ward

Dewsbury South ward

Dewsbury West ward

Golcar ward

Greenhead ward

Heckmondwike ward

Holme Valley North ward

Holme Valley South ward

Kirkburton ward

Lindley ward

Liversedge & Gomersal ward

Mirfield ward

Newsome ward

References

2012 English local elections
2012
2010s in West Yorkshire